"The Longest Voyage" is a science fiction short story by American writer Poul Anderson. It won the Hugo Award for Best Short Story in 1961.

Plot summary
On a distant world the age of exploration is beginning. A party of daring explorers attempts to circumnavigate their world. In unknown waters they encounter an island civilization which claims to have a prophet who fell from the stars.

Reception
"The Longest Voyage" won the 1961 Hugo Award for Best Short Story.

Jean-Daniel Brèque has described "The Longest Voyage" as "a rousing adventure yarn", "solidly plotted, like a well-oiled mechanism", and "also a work of poetry".

Gardner Dozois, upon selecting "The Longest Voyage" for inclusion in his 2000 anthology Explorers: SF Adventures to Far Horizons, said that it is "nearly unmatched" in science fiction for its "lyricism, compassion, subtlety, thoughtfulness, and above all the relish it takes in the bristling strangeness and wonder of the world".

Steven H. Silver commented that what distinguishes "The Longest Voyage" from similar stories is that "Anderson provides strong motivation for both the explorers and the natives".

References

External links

1960 short stories
Short stories by Poul Anderson
Hugo Award for Best Short Story winning works
Works originally published in Analog Science Fiction and Fact